is a 2006 Japanese horror film directed by Shūsuke Kaneko, based upon Kazuo Umezu's ultra-violent/horror manga Kami no Hidarite, Akuma no Migite. The film released on July 14, 2006 at the Fantasia Film Festival. It stars Asuka Shibuya, Ai Maeda, Saaya Irie and Reon Kadena.

Synopsis
So (Tsubasa Kobayashi) is a six-year-old boy capable of seeing horrific images of other people's evil acts. This ability ends up putting him in a coma after one episode leaves him with huge bloody wounds. Sou is able to communicate with his sister Izumi (Asuka Shibuya) through a broken cell phone and he pleads with her to find the killer, as he knows that the person won't stop on their own.

Cast
Asuka Shibuya as Izumi Yamabe
Tsubasa Kobayashi as So Yamabe
Ai Maeda as Yoshiko Tani
Momoko Shimizu as Momo
Saaya as Ayu

References

External links
 
 

2006 films
Films directed by Shusuke Kaneko
Japanese horror films
2006 horror films
2006 fantasy films
Japanese fantasy films
Live-action films based on manga
2000s Japanese films
Japanese slasher films
Kazuo Umezu